Daniel Gómez (28 February 1948 – 20 February 2022) was a Mexican water polo player. He competed at the 1968 Summer Olympics, the 1972 Summer Olympics and the 1976 Summer Olympics. Gómez died in Mexico City on 20 February 2022, at the age of 73.

References

External links
 

1948 births
2022 deaths
Mexican male water polo players
Olympic water polo players of Mexico
Water polo players at the 1968 Summer Olympics
Water polo players at the 1972 Summer Olympics
Water polo players at the 1976 Summer Olympics
Sportspeople from Mexico City
20th-century Mexican people